Esther Goris (born 5 March 1963 in Buenos Aires) is an Argentine actress. Her film career started in 1983 with Los enemigos and Gracias por el fuego (Thanks for the Fire, based on Mario Benedetti homonymous novel). In 1996 she starred in the Argentine entry for the Academy Award for Best Foreign Language Film  Eva Perón: The True Story as the legendary Evita during the last year of her life, alongside Víctor Laplace as Juan Perón.

Goris has also appeared in several TV series and mini-series, the last ones in 2004: Epitafios and El Deseo (The Desire).

External links
 
 

1963 births
Living people
Actresses from Buenos Aires